Hesamabad (also Romanized as Ḩesāmābād; also known as Samāābād) is a village in Dorudzan Rural District, Dorudzan District, Marvdasht County, Fars Province, Iran. At the 2006 census, its population was 1,210, in 291 families.

References 

Populated places in Marvdasht County